Jon Molloy is an English rugby league footballer who played for Wakefield Trinity (Heritage № 1326) in the Super League.

Playing career
Molloy began his career at Huddersfield Giants where first team opportunities were limited. He only made five first team appearances for the club. In 2013 it was announced that Molloy had joined the Wakefield Trinity Wildcats on a two-year deal until the end of the 2014 season. He made his début for the Wakefield Trinity Wildcats against Hemel Stags in the 2013 Challenge Cup where he scored the opening try of the match. He played four more times that season before spending the remainder of the season on loan at Dewsbury Rams.

In 2015 he played in Sheffield Eagles opening game of the season on loan, before returning to the Wakefield Trinity Wildcats.

At the end of the 2015 season Molloy was selected for the Scotland Training squad for the European Championships.

References

1991 births
Living people
Dewsbury Rams players
English rugby league players
Huddersfield Giants players
Place of birth missing (living people)
Rugby league second-rows
Salford Red Devils players
Sheffield Eagles players
Wakefield Trinity players